Andreas Ogris (born 7 October 1964) is an Austrian football manager and former player. He is the older brother of former Austrian international and Hertha BSC player Ernst Ogris.

Club career
Born in Vienna, Ogris played for Austria Wien from 1983 through 1997, split by short spells at Spanish club Espanyol and LASK. The speedy and fiery striker finished his professional career at Admira/Wacker before moving into coaching.

International career
In 1983 Ogris played at the FIFA World Youth Championship.

He then made his senior debut for Austria in October 1986 against Albania and was a participant at the 1990 FIFA World Cup. He earned 63 caps, scoring 11 goals. His last international was an April 1997 World Cup qualification match against Scotland, in which he came on as a late substitute for Franz Aigner.

Coaching career
On 21 February 2014, Ogris was named head coach of the reserve team Austria Wien until the end of the season. However, Herbert Gager was sacked as the head coach of the first–team and didn't accept any other position within the club. Therefore, Ogris took over for Gager on a permanent basis on 2 June 2014. On 22 March 2015, he became head coach of the first team for the remainder of the season after Gerald Baumgartner was sacked. His first match as interim head coach was a 3–1 loss to Red Bull Salzburg. Thorsten Fink became head coach on 4 June 2015 and Ogris became his assistant. His final match as interim head coach was a 2–0 loss to Red Bull Salzburg on 3 June 2015. It was later decided that Ogris would return to the reserve team of Austria Wien.

Coaching record

Honours
Austria Wien
 Austrian Football Bundesliga: 1984, 1985, 1991, 1992, 1993
 Austrian Cup: 1990, 1992, 1994

References

External links
Profile - Austria Archive

1964 births
Living people
Footballers from Vienna
Austrian footballers
Association football forwards
Austria international footballers
Austria youth international footballers
1990 FIFA World Cup players
Austrian Football Bundesliga players
La Liga players
FK Austria Wien players
RCD Espanyol footballers
LASK players
FC Admira Wacker Mödling players
Austrian football managers
FK Austria Wien managers
Floridsdorfer AC managers
1. Simmeringer SC managers
FK Austria Wien non-playing staff
Austrian expatriate footballers
Austrian expatriate sportspeople in Spain
Expatriate footballers in Spain